Zavarijan (also Romanized as Zavārījān; also known as Zawāri Kohneh and Zawāri Kuhneh) is a village in Darreh Seydi Rural District, in the Central District of Borujerd County, Lorestan Province, Iran. At the 2006 census, its population was 117, in 26 families.

References 

Towns and villages in Borujerd County